Kyle Keller may refer to:
Kyle Keller (basketball)
Kyle Keller (baseball)
Kyle Keller (racing driver)